William Lehman (born December 20, 1901, died January 1979) was an American soccer half back who was on the U.S. roster at the 1934 FIFA World Cup.  He played professionally in the St. Louis Soccer League.

Professional career
Lehman played for Wellstones during the 1928-1929 St. Louis Soccer League season.  In 1929, he moved to the newly established Hellrungs.  In 1931, the team passed under new corporate sponsorship and became known as Stix, Baer and Fuller F.C.  In 1934, Lehman and his team mates won their second consecutive National Challenge Cup title.  That year, St. Louis Central Brewery became the team sponsor for a single season.  Breweries went on to win the 1935 National Cup.  Following the Cup win, the team became the St. Louis Shamrocks and left the SLSL.  Lehman remained with the team until it folded in 1938.

National team
Following their 1934 National Cup victory, several of the SBF players, including Lehman, were selected for the U.S. national team at the World Cup.  Lehman earned his one cap with the U.S. national team in its qualification victory over Mexico just prior to the cup.

References

External links
 1934 roster with hometowns
 Roster with birth dates

1901 births
Soccer players from St. Louis
American soccer players
United States men's international soccer players
1934 FIFA World Cup players
St. Louis Soccer League players
Stix, Baer and Fuller F.C. players
St. Louis Central Breweries players
St. Louis Shamrocks players
1979 deaths
Association football midfielders